Idle Hours is an album by blues musicians Lonnie Johnson and Victoria Spivey, recorded in 1962 and released on the Bluesville label.

Reception

AllMusic reviewer Bill Dahl stated: "Johnson and Victoria Spivey had known one another for decades, so it's no surprise that their musical repartee on 1961's Idle Hours seems so natural and playful".

Track listing
All compositions by Lonnie Johnson except where noted
 "Darling, I Miss You So" – 3:23
 "Long Time Blues" – 4:35
 "You Are My Life" – 3:38
 "Oh Yes Baby" – 2:43
 "Please Baby" – 2:52
 "Leave Me or Love Me" – 2:57
 "Idle Hours" (Spivey) – 3:30
 "You Have No Love in Your Heart" – 3:51
 "Good Luck Darling" – 3:20
 "No More Cryin'" – 3:35
 "I Got the Blues So Bad" (Spivey) – 3:03
 "End It All" – 3:16

Personnel

Performance
Lonnie Johnson – guitar, vocals (tracks 1–10 & 12)
Victoria Spivey – vocals, piano (tracks 2, 7 & 11)
Cliff Jackson – piano (tracks 1–8, 10 & 12)

Production
Chris Albertson – supervision
Rudy Van Gelder – engineer

References

Lonnie Johnson (musician) albums
Victoria Spivey albums
1961 albums
Bluesville Records albums
Albums recorded at Van Gelder Studio